Neochauna is a genus of flies in the family Stratiomyidae.

Distribution
Cuba.

Species
Neochauna variabilis (Loew, 1847)

References

Stratiomyidae
Brachycera genera
Taxa named by Samuel Wendell Williston
Diptera of North America
Endemic fauna of Cuba